George Thornton may refer to:

 George Thornton (politician) (1819–1901), Sydney mayor and New South Wales politician
 George Thornton (cricketer) (1867–1939), English and South African cricketer
 George Thornton (American football) (born 1968), NFL player
 George Thornton (rugby union) (born 1997), Scottish rugby union player